Hato Rey station is a rapid transit station in San Juan, Puerto Rico, located in Hato Rey Norte and Milla de Oro financial district. The station was designed by Segundo Cardona FAIA of SCF Architects. It opened on December 17, 2004. The station is located adjacent to the José Miguel Agrelot Coliseum (popularly known as the Choliseo) which it serves.

Extended operating hours
The Hato Rey station is the only station to extend operating hours after nighttime events end at the Choliseo until all passengers in line have entered the station. Late night-scheduled one-way trains run in both directions of the line only from the Hato Rey station. The Bayamón route train will stop at every station only to drop off passengers, instead of picking up, and will continue the route until it reaches the end of the line. There is no service to and from other stations after-hours.

Nearby
 Banco Popular
 Enrique Martí Coll Linear Park and Caño Martín Peña Nature Reserve
 Hato Rey AcuaExpreso Ferry Terminal and the Trocadero Entertainment Complex
 José Miguel Agrelot Coliseum
 Milla de Oro
 Popular Center Urban Hub

Gallery

See also 
 List of San Juan Tren Urbano stations

References

External links 

Tren Urbano stations
Railway stations in the United States opened in 2004
2004 establishments in Puerto Rico